"XTCY" is a song by Kanye West. It was originally released by DJ Clark Kent on August 11, 2018 for free download before released as a single on August 30. The song heavily samples "My Bleeding Wound" by The New Year.

Background
On May 15, 2018, West posted an image of an unfinished track listing for his then-upcoming album Ye. The second song was slated to be "Extacy" and the third track was "Wouldn't Leave". Prior, "Extacy" featured vocals from singer Ty Dolla Sign. After Ye was released without "Extacy", West posted a new track list on June 1, 2018, of his collaborative project with Kid Cudi titled Kids See Ghosts. "Extacy" was placed as the last, unnumbered track on the list. Kids See Ghosts was also released without the track.

Composition
"XTCY" is a hip hop song built around vocals sampled from the 1974 electronic-soul song "My Bleeding Wound" by The New Year. The lyrics, which are as erotic as they are explicit, that West shows in the track have also been shown by him in the songs "I'm In It" and "I Love It". West reuses his "poop, scoop, whoop" ad-libs from "Lift Yourself".

Promotion
On August 11, 2018, DJ Clark Kent tweeted a link to download the song from the file sharing website, WeTransfer. West later retweeted Kent's tweet.

Critical reception
Matt Miller of Esquire viewed the track as unpleasant and described the conclusion as being West explaining "that all this nasty shit he's describing are thoughts he's had while on Ecstasy."

Artwork
The original artwork for "XTCY" is a photo from Kylie Jenner's 21st birthday party, taken at Craig's Restaurant in West Hollywood, California. The artwork features Kanye's wife, Kim Kardashian, and sisters-in-law Khloé Kardashian, Kylie Jenner, Kendall Jenner and Kourtney Kardashian. The artwork is in reference to the lyrics: "You got sick thoughts? I got more of 'em / You got a sister-in-law you'd smash? I got four of 'em". Upset reactions were shown from fans of The Kardashians via Twitter to these lyrics.

The official cover art for the song's release as a single, revealed on August 30, 2018, is a painting of the same photo by London-based artist Shadi Al-Atallah, who would also produce the cover art for Kanye's proceeding single "I Love It".

Commercial performance
Following on from its release as a single, "XTCY" managed to reach number 32 on the New Zealand Hot Singles chart.

Credits and personnel
Credits adapted from Tidal.

 Kanye West – performance, production
 Andrew Dawson – co-production, engineering
 Mike Dean – engineering, mixing
 Mike Malchicoff – engineering
 Zack Djurich – engineering
 Sean Solymar – assistant recording engineering
 Jess Jackson – mixing

Charts

Release history

Notes

References

2018 songs
2018 singles
Dirty rap songs
Kanye West songs
Song recordings produced by Kanye West
Songs written by Kanye West